Alsophila sternbergii is a species of tree fern in the family Cyatheaceae.

References

sternbergii